Damir Hadžić (born 2 October 1978) is a retired Bosnian-Herzegovinian professional footballer who played as a winger and spent most of his career with Bosnian-Herzegovinian Premier League club Sarajevo.

References

1978 births
Living people
Sportspeople from Zenica
Association football wingers
Bosnia and Herzegovina footballers
NK Žepče players
FK Sarajevo players
FK Sloboda Tuzla players
First League of the Federation of Bosnia and Herzegovina players
Premier League of Bosnia and Herzegovina players